Andrew Crisp   is a senior public servant and former police officer in Australia who has provided active service to United Nations, Victoria Police and Emergency Management Victoria. Crisp has served as the Emergency Management Commissioner for Victoria since 13 August 2018.

Crisp previously held the position of Deputy Commissioner of Regional Operations of Victoria Police, appointed to this position by Chief Commissioner Graham Ashton in November 2015, after having served Victoria Police for 37 years. Prior to serving as Deputy Commissioner, Crisp served as Assistant Commissioner of State Emergencies and Security Command.

Crisp is a Returned Peacekeeping Veteran, having served in East Timor with the Australian Federal Police.  Crisp also served in a capacity building mission to PNG.

Crisp was awarded the Australian Police Medal in the 2012 Australia Day Honours. In 2022, Crisp was appointed Member of the Order of Australia in the 2022 Queen's Birthday Honours for "significant service to the emergency management sector in Victoria".

References

Australian police officers
Living people
Members of the Order of Australia
Recipients of the Australian Police Medal
Year of birth missing (living people)